"Rat Race" is a single by British rock band Enter Shikari. The song was first played on Zane Lowe's BBC Radio One show on the evening of 31 October 2013. The single was released with a remix of the song Radiate by Enter Shikari's alter ego Shikari Sound System. The band also released an EP, which compiled the two previous singles "The Paddington Frisk" and "Radiate".

The "Rat Race" single peaked at #77 on the UK Singles Chart on 16 November 2013.

Music video
The music video was released on the band's official YouTube page on 31 October.

Track listings
Digital download
 "Rat Race" – 3:17
 "Radiate" (Shikari Sound System Remix) – 3:49

CD
 "Rat Race" – 3:17
 "Rat Race" (Radio Edit) – 3:00
 "Radiate" (Shikari Sound System Remix) – 3:49

EP
 "The Paddington Frisk" - 1:16
 "Radiate" – 4:32
 "Rat Race" – 3:17
 "Radiate" (Shikari Sound System Remix) – 3:49

Personnel
Enter Shikari
Roughton "Rou" Reynolds – lead vocals, synthesizer, keyboards, programming
Chris Batten – bass guitar, vocals, co-lead vocals on "Rat Race"
Liam "Rory" Clewlow – guitar, vocals
Rob Rolfe – drums, percussion, backing vocals

References

External links

Rat Race at YouTube (streamed copy where licensed)

Enter Shikari songs
2013 singles
2013 songs
Albums produced by Dan Weller